{{DISPLAYTITLE:C41H26O26}}
The molecular formula C41H26O26 (molar mass: 934.63 g/mol, exact mass: 934.0712 u) may refer to:

 Alnusiin, an ellagitannin
 Castalagin, an ellagitannin

Molecular formulas